Katherine McClure (born April 16, 1981) is a Canadian actress and  beauty pageant titleholder. She won Miss Earth Canada 2005 and represented her country in the 2005 Miss Earth pageant.

Pageantry
McClure has participated in several Canadian pageantry competitions, including Miss Toronto International (2003), Miss Canada International (2004), and Miss Toronto Galaxy (2004). She won Miss Congeniality in the Miss Earth 2005 pageant that took place on October 23, 2005 in Quezon City, Philippines.

Advocacy 
McClure is an advocate for Amnesty International, Plan Canada, Earthroots Canada, The Equator Initiative, and the Kalinga Mission for Indigenous Children and Youth Development.

Acting career
McClure has performed in a number of Canadian theater productions.

References 

1981 births
Living people
Miss Earth 2005 contestants
Miss Canada winners
Place of birth missing (living people)